The Braunschweiger Zeitung is a daily regional newspaper serving Braunschweig, Germany and surrounding towns and villages in Brunswick Land. It is operated by the BZV Medienhaus GmbH, headquartered in Braunschweig.

Local editions
There are seven local editions of the paper. Besides the main edition Braunschweiger Zeitung, local editions are published under the following titles:
 Gifhorner Rundschau
 Helmstedter Nachrichten
 Peiner Nachrichten
 Salzgitter-Zeitung
 Wolfenbütteler Zeitung
 Wolfsburger Nachrichten

References

External links

  

1946 establishments in Germany
German-language newspapers
Mass media in Braunschweig
Daily newspapers published in Germany
Newspapers established in 1946